Southeast Township is one of ten townships in Orange County, Indiana, United States. As of the 2010 census, its population was 1,603 and it contained 717 housing units.

History
Southeast Township was named from its position in the southeastern corner of Orange County.

Geography

Unincorporated towns
 Bacon at 
 Pearsontown at 
 Pine Valley at 
 Rego at 
 Valeene at 
(This list is based on USGS data and may include former settlements.)

Cemeteries
The township contains Little Africa Cemetery.

Major highways
  U.S. Route 150
  Indiana State Road 37

School districts
 Paoli Community School Corporation

Political districts
 Indiana's 9th congressional district
 State House District 62
 State Senate District 44

References
 
 United States Census Bureau 2008 TIGER/Line Shapefiles
 IndianaMap

External links
 Indiana Township Association
 United Township Association of Indiana
 City-Data.com page for Southeast Township

Townships in Orange County, Indiana
Townships in Indiana